The Walashma dynasty was a medieval Muslim dynasty of the Horn of Africa. Founded in the 13th century, it governed the Ifat and Adal Sultanates in what are present-day Somalia, Djibouti and eastern Ethiopia.

Genealogical traditions
The Walashma princes of Ifat and Adal claimed to possessed Arab genealogical traditions. In terms of lineage, Walashma traditions trace descent from Banu Makhzum tribe by El Maqrisi. But Ifat Sultanate trace descent from  Akīl ibn Abī Tālib, the brother of the Caliph ʿAlī and Djaʿfar ibn Abī Tālib. The latter was among the earliest Muslims to settle in the Horn region. However, the semi-legendary apologetic History of the Walasma asserts that ʿUmar ibn-Dunya-hawz had as a progenitor Caliph ʿAlī's son al-Hasan. This is not supported by both Maqrizi and the chronicle of the Walashma. But ʿUmar ibn-Dunya-hawz, whom both assert was the founder of the dynasty, was of Quraysh or Hashimite origin.

However, most historians regard the Walashma dynasty to be of local origin, most likely ethnic Argobbas from eastern Shewa. It was here in eastern Shewa that ʿUmar ibn DunyaHuz overthrew the Makhzumi dynasty and established the Ifat Sultanate. Enrico Cerulli suggests that one of the ancestors of might of ʿUmar ibn DunyaHuz might of been the Sheikh Yusuf bin Ahmad al-Kawneyn. J. Spencer Trimingham considers this to be unlikely, as according to local traditions, he died in the early 16th century.

Language
The 19th-century Ethiopian historian Asma Giyorgis suggests that the Walashma themselves spoke Arabic.

Sultanate of Ifat

During the end of the 13th century, northern Hararghe was seat of a Muslim sultanate named under the rule of Makhzumi dynasty. A contemporary source describes the sultanate being torn apart by internal strafe and weakened by struggles with neighboring Muslim states. In 1278 one of these neighboring states, named Ifat in eastern Shewa, led by the Walashma invaded the Sultanate of Showa. After a few years of struggle the sultanate was annexed into Ifat. This annexation is usually attributed to ʿUmar, but he had been dead for 50 years by the time Showa was annexed. More likely, it was his grandson Jamal ad-Dīn or perhaps even his great-grandson Abūd. In 1288 Sultan Wali Asma successfully invaded Hubat, Zeila and other Muslim states in the region. Making Ifat the most powerful Muslim kingdom in the Horn of Africa.

In 1332, the Sultan of Ifat, Haqq ad-Din I was slain in a military campaign against the Abyssinian Emperor Amda Seyon's troops. Amda Seyon then appointed Jamal ad-Din as the new King, followed by Jamal ad-Din's brother Nasr ad-Din. Despite this setback, the Muslim rulers of Ifat continued their campaign. The Abyssinian Emperor branded the Muslims of the surrounding area "enemies of the Lord", and again invaded Ifat in the early 15th century. After much struggle, Ifat's troops were defeated and the Sultanate's ruler, King Sa'ad ad-Din II, fled to Zeila. He was pursued there by Abyssinian forces, where they slayed him.

Sultans of Ifat

Sultanate of Adal

Islam was introduced to the Horn of Africa early on from the Arabian peninsula, shortly after the hijra. In the late 9th century, Al-Yaqubi wrote that Muslims were living along the northern Somali seaboard. He also mentioned that the Adal kingdom had its capital in the city, suggesting that the Adal Sultanate with Zeila as its headquarters dates back to at least the 9th or 10th century. According to I.M. Lewis, the polity was governed by local dynasties consisting of Somalized Arabs or Arabized Somalis, who also ruled over the similarly-established Sultanate of Mogadishu in the Benadir region to the south. Adal's history from this founding period forth would be characterized by a succession of battles with neighbouring Abyssinia.

After the last Sultan of Ifat, Sa'ad ad-Din II, was killed in Zeila in 1410, his children escaped to Yemen, before later returning in 1415. In the early 15th century, Adal's capital was moved further inland to the town of Dakkar, where Sabr ad-Din II, the eldest son of Sa'ad ad-Din II, established a new base after his return from Yemen.

Adal's headquarters were again relocated the following century, this time to Harar. From this new capital, Adal organised an effective army led by Imam Ahmad ibn Ibrahim al-Ghazi (Ahmad "Gurey" or Ahmad "Gran") that invaded the Abyssinian empire. This 16th century campaign is historically known as the Conquest of Abyssinia (Futuh al-Habash). During the war, Imam Ahmad pioneered the use of cannons supplied by the Ottoman Empire, which he imported through Zeila and deployed against Abyssinian forces and their Portuguese allies led by Cristóvão da Gama. Some scholars argue that this conflict proved, through their use on both sides, the value of firearms like the matchlock musket, cannons and the arquebus over traditional weapons.

Sultans of Adal

See also
Somali aristocratic and court titles
Ethiopian aristocratic and court titles

References

Works cited

Further reading
Kifleyesus, Abbebe (2006). Tradition and Transformation: The Argobba of Ethiopia. Otto Harrassowitz Verlag. p. 84. .

 
History of Ethiopia
Somaliland noble families
African royal families
1185 establishments
12th-century establishments in Africa
1559 disestablishments in Africa
Adal Sultanate
Medieval Somalia